Willaim Wright was one of two Members of the Parliament of England for the constituency of York on one occasions.

Life and politics
 
There are few records detailing the life of William Wright. Born around 1482 to William Wright. He was a merchant and notary who became a member of Corpus Christi Guild in 1503 and held the offices of sheriff (1511–1512)  and Alderman of the City of York (1514).

He was elected to represent the city as MP in 1515, but this was his only term in office. He was originally intended to serve with Alan Staveley, but Staveley was replaced by the more experienced William Nelson. He also served as lord mayor of York (1518–1519) having been elected by letters patent. At some point after serving as MP he married Urusula Joye of Riccall. In 1523 he was contracted by Cardinal Wolsey to be master of the archiepiscopal mint. He served a second term a lord mayor in 1535 which was marked by a dispute over the lands at Bishopfields with the Archibishop of York. William was a named executor of the will of fellow merchant and horner, William Huby.

He recorded his will on 10 April 1543, shortly before his death. He requested to be buried in St Martin's Church in Coney Street and left a third of his goods to his wife and children.

References

Members of the Parliament of England for constituencies in Yorkshire
1482 births